Efrén Fierro (26 May 1929 – 2007) was a Mexican freestyle swimmer. He competed in two events at the 1952 Summer Olympics.

References

External links
 

1929 births
2007 deaths
Mexican male freestyle swimmers
Olympic swimmers of Mexico
Swimmers at the 1952 Summer Olympics
Place of birth missing
Pan American Games bronze medalists for Mexico
Pan American Games medalists in swimming
Swimmers at the 1951 Pan American Games
Medalists at the 1951 Pan American Games